NBPO may refer to:
 Dutch Union of Personnel in Government Service, a former Dutch trade union
 New Blue Party of Ontario, a political party in Ontario